Lauraguel (Languedocien: Lauraguèl) is a commune in the Aude department in southern France.

Population

See also
Communes of the Aude department

References

External links

 Official website

Communes of Aude
Aude communes articles needing translation from French Wikipedia